Jiří Tibor Novak  is a Czech-born Australian artist, illustrator, and writer. He teaches drawing and illustration for graphic design at the Gordon Institute of TAFE, Geelong City Campus.

Books

As author
 Fish and bird, Oxford University Press, Melbourne, 1981.
 Vienna, Nosukumo, Melbourne, 1992.

As illustrator
 Nan McNab, Crocoroos and kangadiles, Allan Cornwell, Mt Martha, 2006.
 Frightfully fearful tales, Macmillan, South Melbourne, 1987.
 Birdman, Random House Australia, 1994. 
 Insy winsy spider, Allan Cornwell, 1994?
Old MacDonald, Allan Cornwell, 1994. 
 Monday's child,
 Yeebah of the You Yangs, with the Children of Lara Primary School,1995. 
 You can make mobiles, Allen & Unwin, 1996. 
 Nan McNab, The Circle Book
 Nan McNab, The Square Book
 Nan McNab, The Star Book
 Nan McNab, The Triangle Book

References

External links

 AustLit entry

1947 births
Living people
Australian children's writers
Australian people of Czech descent
Czechoslovak emigrants to Australia